The Taiwan Design Research Institute (TDRI) is an art organization based in Songshan Cultural and Creative Park, Taipei, Taiwan.

History
The organization was established in 2003 as the Taiwan Design Center. In addition to the Industrial Development Bureau, the Taiwan Design Center also works with the Ministry of Culture and the Ministry of Economic Affairs.

In 2014, the Taiwan Design Center and the American Institute in Taiwan jointly established the American Innovation Center. Since then, the three organizations have jointly organized several events. In 2019, the Taiwan Design Center hosted the art exhibition of the inaugural Taiwan Pattern Design Festival.

The Center was renamed the Taiwan Design Research Institute (TDRI) in 2020.

See also
 Culture of Taiwan

References

External links

 

2003 establishments in Taiwan
Arts organizations established in 2003
Organizations based in Taipei